Han Yo-han (Hangul: 한요한; born December 3, 1991), is a South Korean rapper and composer. He released his debut EP, Selfmade, on May 21, 2015. He is best known for the song "Dding" which he features in alongside Jvcki Wai, Young B and Osshun Gum.

Discography

Studio albums

Extended plays

Singles

References

1991 births
Living people
South Korean male rappers
South Korean hip hop singers
21st-century South Korean  male singers